Harry David Balraj Pell (born 21 October 1991) is an English professional footballer who plays as a midfielder for League Two club AFC Wimbledon.

Pell came through the youth system at Charlton Athletic where he spent 12 years. He spent time on loan at Hastings United in 2010, before moving to Bristol Rovers. He joined  Hereford United in 2011, initially on loan, later signing permanently. He then had a loan spell at Cambridge United and then moved to AFC Wimbledon in 2013. He had another loan spell, this time at Grimsby Town in 2014, moving to Eastleigh in 2015. He spent three years with Cheltenham Town between 2015 and 2018, and then signed for Colchester United in May 2018.

Career

Early years 
Pell was born in Tilbury, Essex. He joined the youth set-up at Charlton Athletic at the age of seven and for the next 11 years he progressed through "The Addicks'" youth system. In the 2008–09 season, his first as a professional, he made 22 appearances for the under-18 squad. The following season, Pell scored for Charlton Athletic in a 3–0 win over Gillingham in the First Round of the 2009–10 FA Youth Cup on 4 November 2009. In spite of this, the 18-year-old midfielder failed to break into the first team and was sent out on loan to Isthmian League Premier Division side Hastings United on 18 January 2010. He stayed with "The Arrows" for the remainder of the season, scoring four goals in 16 appearances. Despite his promising performances, however, the 18-year-old midfielder was released by Charlton Athletic at the end of the 2009–10 season. After trials at Gillingham, Bristol Rovers and Wycombe Wanderers, he signed for League One side Bristol Rovers on a one-year contract on 28 May 2010.

Bristol Rovers 
Pell featured as an unused substitute ten times for Bristol Rovers before finally making his debut on 13 November 2010, coming on as a 74th minute substitute for Stuart Campbell in a 3–0 defeat by Leyton Orient. In January 2011, having still made just one appearance for Bristol Rovers, he was loaned out to Hereford United on an initial one-month deal on 31 January 2011 so that he might gain more match time. His loan was extended by a further month on 1 March 2011, with the 20-year-old having helped Hereford United to five wins in his six appearances for the club. Having produced a string of impressive performances for "The Bulls", Pell's extended loan was cut short and he was recalled by Bristol Rovers on 7 March 2011. On his return to "The Pirates" the midfielder was rewarded with nine more games in the first team as well as winning the club's Young Player of the Year award at the end of the season. He was offered a new contract at the end of the 2010–11 season after his initial one-year deal had expired, however Pell left the club on 30 June 2011 and opted to re-join Hereford United on a permanent deal.

Hereford United 
Pell signed a two-year contract with "The Bulls" on 8 July 2011. He scored his first goal for Hereford United on 8 October 2011 in a 3–3 draw against Swindon Town, clinching the winner in the 90th minute of play. The midfielder scored his second three games later on 25 October 2011 in a 3–1 win over Northampton Town. On 22 March 2012, it was announced that Pell had joined Cambridge United on a one-month emergency loan. He made his debut for Cambridge United on 3 April 2012 in a 1–0 victory over Lincoln City. Pell scored his first goal for Cambridge United on 9 April 2012 in a 2–0 win over Kettering Town. His second followed the next game in a 3–1 win over Barrow on 14 April 2012. On 19 April 2012, Pell was recalled by Hereford United in a bid to help save the club from relegation from the Football League. Pell scored a penalty in a 3–2 win over Torquay United in the last game of the 2011–12 season, on 5 May 2012. However, the win came too late to save "The Bulls" from relegation to the Conference National for the 2012–13 season. In the second league game of the 2012–13 season, on 14 August 2012, he scored what would be his last goal for Hereford United in a 2–2 draw with Tamworth.

AFC Wimbledon 
On 28 January 2013, it was announced that Pell had signed for League Two side AFC Wimbledon on a two-and-a-half-year deal for an undisclosed fee, believed to be in the region of £30,000. He made his debut for AFC Wimbledon on 2 February 2013 in a 1–1 draw against Burton Albion. On 26 February 2013, Pell scored his first goal for AFC Wimbledon in a 1–1 draw against Plymouth Argyle. On 9 March 2013, he scored the winning goal for the Dons in a 3–2 victory over York City. Pell scored "The Dons" first goal of the 2013–14 season, and the third of his AFC Wimbledon career, in a 1–1 draw against Torquay United at Plainmoor on 3 August 2013.

In the 2014–15 season, Pell struggled for first team place and spent most of the first half of the season on the bench. Struggling for the first team place at Wimbledon frustrated him. On 29 October 2014, Pell joined Grimsby Town on an initial one-month loan. Pell struggled being away from his young family. Pell decided to sign for Eastleigh on the 29th of January for the rest of the season, which the team reached the playoffs of the national league.

Cheltenham Town 

Pell signed for Cheltenham town at the start of the 2015–16 campaign, of which Gary Johnson labelled him one of his key signings. Pell became a national league title winner, His efforts over the season earned him a place in the 2015–16 National League team of the year, alongside the league's outstanding players.

Colchester United 
On 10 May 2018, Pell completed a transfer to Colchester United for an undisclosed six-figure fee on a three-year contract. He made his competitive debut on 4 August, playing the full 90-minutes of a 0–0 draw with Notts County. On 1 September, he scored his first goal for Colchester against his former club Cheltenham from the penalty spot in a 3–1 win for the U's.

Pell was named club captain on 4 September 2020 ahead of the 2020–21 season, following Luke Prosser's summer departure.

After three years with Colchester, Pell left the Essex club at the end of his contract in May 2021. He made 89 appearances and scored 13 goals for the U's.

Accrington Stanley 
League One side Accrington Stanley announced the signing of Pell on a three-year contract on 14 May 2021, the same day as his release from Colchester was announced.

AFC Wimbledon return
On 24 August 2022, Pell returned to former club AFC Wimbledon for an undisclosed fee on a two-year contract.

Career statistics 

14A.  The "Other" column constitutes appearances (including substitutions) and goals in the Football League Trophy, FA Trophy, Isthmian League Cup and Sussex Senior Cup.

Honours
Cheltenham Town
National League: 2015–16

Individual
National League Team of the Year: 2015–16

References

External links 

1991 births
Living people
People from Tilbury
English footballers
Association football midfielders
Charlton Athletic F.C. players
Hastings United F.C. players
Bristol Rovers F.C. players
Hereford United F.C. players
Cambridge United F.C. players
AFC Wimbledon players
Grimsby Town F.C. players
Eastleigh F.C. players
Cheltenham Town F.C. players
Colchester United F.C. players
Accrington Stanley F.C. players
Isthmian League players
English Football League players
National League (English football) players